Penco was a brand of guitars owned and manufactured by the Hoshino Gakki Co. in its factory of Nagoya, Japan. Ibanez guitars was another brand owned and manufactured by Hoshino Gakki. In the United States, Penco guitars were distributed by the Philadelphia Music Company.

Penco line of products consisted of electric and acoustic guitars, most of them were copies (also known as "lawsuit guitars") of renowned US guitar like Fender or Gibson, produced by Japanese companies in the 1970s. The term "lawsuit guitar" originated after a lawsuit filed by Norlin (Gibson's parent company) against Elger (owner of Ibanez) over trademark infringent in 1977.

History 
The Penco brand was of relatively high quality. Their acoustics were usually but not always made with laminated back and sides and often laminated tops. Penco made Martin and Gibson style acoustic guitars. Reverse engineered and built to spec, Penco produced some of the closest replicas of the Martin D-28, D-35, D-41, D-45, and D-45 12 models in existence today. Penco also made bolt neck copies of Gibson's Les Paul and SG guitars and basses, Rickenbacker 4001 basses, Fender Stratocaster/Fender Telecaster copies, Fender Jazz Bass copies; and the odd mandolin and banjo.

They also made 12-string acoustic guitars. The Penco brand was also put on "lawsuit" Korina-finished Gibson Explorer-styled guitars. These were identical to the Ibanez Destroyer and the Greco Destroyer of the same period. The Ibanez line was distributed on the West coast of the U.S., while the Greco was exclusively for Japan, and Penco was distributed on the East coast of the U.S. There is bit of variance between the Penco acoustic models depending on what year the guitar was manufactured. A Penco A22M may or may not have an adjustable saddle via thumbscrews.  Also some of the models have book matched backs while others maybe tri-backed.

Most Penco acoustics had solid spruce tops and laminated backs and sides of maple or rosewood depending on the model. The A24 is a 12 string acoustic guitar, with a solid –but relatively thin– spruce top, rosewood sides and back and a mahogany neck with rosewood fingerboard. They had a zero fret and a screw adjustable bridge modeled after the Gibson Heritage Jumbo bridge of that period. They sold new for around $140 in the mid-1970s. The A10 was a solid top AA or AAA size Rosewood Laminated back and possibly their first acoustic model.

The Penco A25 12-string acoustic guitar had a solid spruce top with solid rosewood back and sides. The back was a 4 piece book-matched back.

Models 
Some of the models commercialised with the Penco brand were:

 5502N Strat,
 A-8M
 A-12
 A-13
 A-14-JD
 A-14-M
 A-15-JD
 A-16
 A-170
 A-18
 A-19 
 A-19-JD 
 A-20 12
 A-22-M
 A-25 
 A-230
 A-330 (Hummingbird copy)
 A-340 (Dove copy)
 A-6
 E-70
 ES Copy
 Howard Roberts ES-175 copy
 J-200
 Les Paul / Les Paul Custom copy
 SG Copy
 SG Bass copy 
 Strat copy
 Rickenbacker 4001 copy
 Telecaster copy
 Jazz Bass copy

See also 
 Hoshino Gakki
 Ibanez

References 

Guitars
Defunct companies of Japan